USDS may refer to:

 United States Department of State -- a U.S. government department
 United States Digital Service -- a government office of the U.S. Executive Office of the President
 United Synagogue Day School